Denis Orval Lapalme (April 29, 1959 – November 1, 2021) was a Canadian amputee athlete and actor, most noted as a competitor and medalist at the Paralympic Games.

Born in Timmins, Ontario, Lapalme lost both legs in a train accident in childhood. As an adult he was based principally in Ottawa, where he has worked as a civil servant.

Athletic career
He competed in swimming at the 1976 Summer Paralympics in Toronto, winning a bronze medal in the men's 100-metre freestyle and a silver in the men's 100-metre breaststroke.

At the 1980 Summer Paralympics in Arnhem, Netherlands, he competed in both track and swimming, winning gold medals in the men's 100-metre sprint, javelin and 100-meter backstroke, a silver medal in the 100-metre breaststroke, and a bronze medal in the 100-metre freestyle.

Lapalme competed on the men's wheelchair basketball team at both the 1988 Summer Paralympics in Seoul, South Korea and the 1992 Summer Paralympics in Barcelona, Spain. but the team did not medal at either event.

He also competed nationally and internationally in other track and wheelchair basketball competitions below the Paralympic level, including at the IWAS World Games in 1979.

Although no longer active as a Paralympic competitor after 1992, he remained involved in sports as late as the early 2010s as captain of the Ottawa Sledgehammers, the city's sledge hockey team. Lapalme died on November 1, 2021, in Hull, Quebec at the age of 62 of brain cancer.

Acting
Following the end of his Paralympic career he was cast in his first acting role, as Jerome of Sandy Cove in Phil Comeau's 1994 film Jerome's Secret. He subsequently had small parts in the films Bleeders and Two Lovers and a Bear, and an episode of the television series F/X: The Series.

References

External links

1959 births
2021 deaths
Athletes from Ottawa
Canadian amputees
Canadian male film actors
Canadian male television actors
Paralympic swimmers of Canada
Paralympic wheelchair basketball players of Canada
Paralympic track and field athletes of Canada
Paralympic gold medalists for Canada
Paralympic silver medalists for Canada
Paralympic bronze medalists for Canada
Athletes (track and field) at the 1980 Summer Paralympics
Swimmers at the 1976 Summer Paralympics
Swimmers at the 1980 Summer Paralympics
Wheelchair basketball players at the 1988 Summer Paralympics
Wheelchair basketball players at the 1992 Summer Paralympics
Medalists at the 1976 Summer Paralympics
Medalists at the 1980 Summer Paralympics
Sportspeople from Timmins
Swimmers from Ottawa
Male actors from Ottawa
Amputee actors
Canadian sledge hockey players
Javelin throwers with limb difference
Canadian male wheelchair racers
Franco-Ontarian people